SMOC may refer to:

 South Middlesex Opportunities Council, a private social service group in Massachusetts, US
 Saint Mary's Orthodox College, a school in Lebanon
 Smoke Committee (SmoC), an operating group of the US National Wildfire Coordinating Group
 Standard Mean Ocean Chloride, a measure of Chlorine-37